Senator Roberts may refer to:

Members of the United States Senate
Jonathan Roberts (politician) (1771–1854), U.S. Senator from Pennsylvania from 1814 to 1821
Pat Roberts (born 1936), U.S. Senator from Kansas since 2011

United States state senate members
Adelbert H. Roberts (1866–1937), Illinois State Senate
Betty Roberts (1923–2011), Oregon State Senate
Clint Roberts (politician) (1935–2017), South Dakota State Senate
Dennis J. Roberts (1903–1994), Rhode Island State Senate
Elizabeth H. Roberts (born 1957), Rhode Island State Senate
Ellen Roberts (born 1959), Colorado State Senate
Ernest W. Roberts (1858–1924), Massachusetts State Senate
Frank L. Roberts (1915–1993), Oregon State Senate
Henry Roberts (governor) (1853–1929), Connecticut State Senate
Kenneth A. Roberts (1912–1989), Alabama State Senate
Kerry Roberts (born c. 1960), Tennessee State Senate
Mary Wendy Roberts (born 1944), Oregon State Senate
Ray Roberts (1913–1992), Texas State Senate
Robert H. Roberts (1837–1888), New York State Senate
Rollan Roberts, West Virginia State Senate
Tom Roberts (Ohio politician) (born 1952), Ohio State Senate
Tommy Ed Roberts (1940–2014), Alabama State Senate